DVD Player is an app developed by Microsoft that plays DVD-Video on Microsoft Windows. DVD Player was introduced in Windows 98, and was included in Windows ME and Windows 2000 before removal from Windows XP and beyond. After Windows XP, DVD playback was built into other apps such as Windows Media Player and Windows Media Center instead. Following the discontinuation of Media Center in Windows 10 and the removal of DVD codecs from Windows 8, DVD Player was reintroduced to Windows 10 as an app available from Microsoft Store.

Windows 98, 2000, and ME versions

When the DVD Player is launched, it searches all local drives in alphabetical order from C:, looking for a Video_TS folder. When this folder is located, the data file within it is loaded, and video streaming begins. If this folder exists on a drive that comes before the DVD drive, the player will try to play the data in the first folder it finds.

In Windows 98 and Windows 2000, DVD Player only plays DVDs if a hardware-based MPEG decoder is present. In Windows ME, DVD Player supports software-based MPEG decoders.

DVD Player was dropped in Windows XP in favor of the DVD functionality introduced into Windows Media Player. While the DVDPlay executable still resides in %Windir%\system32, it simply executes Windows Media Player. On Windows 8, Windows Media Center and DVD playback support were relegated to a premium add-on for Windows 8 Pro, citing the costs of licensing the decoders and the market moving away from DVD-Video.

Windows 10 version

Windows DVD Player was made available for Windows 10 on desktop computers to provide DVD playback functionality. When launched, it searches for movie files in the disc drive. It can also be picked as an option in the AutoPlay dialog when a disc is inserted. However, if the disc is switched, the app needs to restart. It is available as a paid app through Microsoft Store, although it is distributed at no charge to those who had upgraded from an installation of Windows 7 or Windows 8 that included Windows Media Center.

References

External links

 Windows DVD Player on Microsoft Store

Microsoft software
Microsoft Windows multimedia technology
Windows media players
Universal Windows Platform apps